Ancistrus leucostictus is a species of armored catfish native to Guyana where it is found in the Essequibo River basin. There have been reports that it may also be found in French Guiana and Suriname. This species grows to a length of  SL.

References
 

leucostictus
Fish of South America
Vertebrates of Guyana
Fish described in 1864
Taxa named by Albert Günther